is a Japanese female professional ten-pin bowler. She is a member of the Ladies Bowling Organization of Japan.

Major accomplishments  
DHC
 DHC Ladies Bowling Tour 2007/08 - 1st leg (22nd place)
 DHC Ladies Bowling Tour 2007/08 - 2nd leg (19th place)
 DHC Ladies Bowling Tour 2007/08 - 3rd leg (17th place)

References

External links 
DHC Profile

1987 births
Living people
People from Tokyo
Japanese ten-pin bowling players